Dilworth is a city in Clay County, Minnesota, United States. The population was 4,612 at the time of the 2020 census. Dilworth is one of the core cities of the Fargo–Moorhead metro area; it is on the eastern border of Moorhead. Dilworth is home to the historic Star Lite Motel and the Dilworth Rail Yard, one of the BNSF Railway's largest and busiest facilities in Minnesota.

History
Dilworth was founded in 1883 when the Northern Pacific Railroad was extended to that point. It was named for Joseph Dilworth, a railroad official.

Geography

Demographics

2010 census
As of the census of 2010, there were 4,024 people, 1,595 households, and 1,053 families living in the city. The racial makeup of the city was 93.3% White, 0.5% African American, 2.1% Native American, 0.8% Asian, 1.2% from other races, and 2.0% from two or more races. Hispanic or Latino of any race were 5.7% of the population.

There were 1,595 households, of which 36.2% had children under the age of 18 living with them, 51.0% were married couples living together, 10.2% had a female householder with no husband present, 4.8% had a male householder with no wife present, and 34.0% were non-families. 28.3% of all households were made up of individuals, and 9.4% had someone living alone who was 65 years of age or older. The average household size was 2.52 and the average family size was 3.11.

The median age in the city was 34.3 years. 28.7% of residents were under the age of 18; 7.8% were between the ages of 18 and 24; 27.7% were from 25 to 44; 24.2% were from 45 to 64; and 11.7% were 65 years of age or older. The gender makeup of the city was 50.0% male and 50.0% female.

2000 census
As of the census of 2000, there were 3,001 people, 1,160 households, and 787 families living in the city. The racial makeup of the city was 91.64% White, 0.03% African American, 1.80% Native American, 0.20% Asian, 4.20% from other races, and 2.13% from two or more races. Hispanic or Latino of any race were 7.63% of the population.

There were 1,160 households, out of which 39.4% had children under the age of 18 living with them, 49.7% were married couples living together, 13.2% had a female householder with no husband present, and 32.1% were non-families. 27.1% of all households were made up of individuals, and 10.0% had someone living alone who was 65 years of age or older. The average household size was 2.59 and the average family size was 3.17.

In the city, the population was spread out, with 31.9% under the age of 18, 8.5% from 18 to 24, 30.0% from 25 to 44, 19.2% from 45 to 64, and 10.5% who were 65 years of age or older. The median age was 33 years. For every 100 females, there were 93.7 males. For every 100 females age 18 and over, there were 91.7 males.

The median income for a household in the city was $34,571, and the median income for a family was $42,887. Males had a median income of $32,857 versus $21,226 for females. The per capita income for the city was $14,726. About 13.7% of families and 16.1% of the population were below the poverty line, including 23.5% of those under age 18 and 5.6% of those age 65 or over.

Transportation
Dilworth is connected to Moorhead and Fargo with the public transit provider MATBUS.

U.S. Route 10 (more commonly called Highway 10) serves as a main roadway in the city. Interstate 94 is nearby, connected to U.S. 10 by Minnesota State Highway 336.

References

External links

Clay County Historical Society site
Dilworth Photo Gallery

Cities in Minnesota
Cities in Clay County, Minnesota
Fargo–Moorhead